Sonqorabad (also Romanized as Sonqorābād) is a village in  Sonqorabad Rural District, Chaharbagh District, Savojbolagh County, Alborz Province, Iran. At the 2006 census, its population was 1,376, in 337 families.

References 

Populated places in Savojbolagh County